This is a list of notable people affiliated with Lund University, either as students or as researchers and academic teachers (or both). Lund University, located in the town of Lund in Skåne, Sweden, was founded in 1666.

Nobel laureates affiliated with Lund University
Manne Siegbahn (1886-1978), Physics 1924; professor at Uppsala University (B.A. 1908, Ph.D. 1911)
Bertil Ohlin (1899-1979), Economics 1977; professor at the Stockholm School of Economics; leader of the liberal Liberal People's Party, 1944-1967 (B.A. 1917)
Sune Bergström (1916-2004), Medicine 1982 (Professor 1947-1958)
Arvid Carlsson (1923-2018), Medicine 2000 (M.D. 1951, Assistant Professor 1951-1959)

Government, politics and civil service
Gbehzohngar Milton Findley (1960-) Liberia Politician and Businessman, Former Senate Pro-tempore, and Former Minister of Foreign Affairs
Peter Estenberg (1686–1740), Greek scholar, professor, and advisor to King Stanislaw (Stanisław Leszczyński) of Poland in the early 18th century
Lars von Engeström (1751–1826), statesman and diplomat, first Prime Minister for Foreign Affairs 1809–1824, Chancellor of Lund University 1810–1824
Arvid Posse (1820–1901), Prime Minister of Sweden 1880–1883 (B.A. 1840)
Östen Undén (1886–1974), Rector Magnificus of Uppsala University and politician; Minister for Foreign Affairs 1924-26, 1945-62 (B.A. 1905, LL.B. 1910, LL.D. 1912) 
Ernst Wigforss (1881–1977), linguist and politician, Swedish Minister of Finance (Ph.D. 1913)
Per Edvin Sköld (1891–1972), held various cabinet posts from 1932, Minister of Finance 1949–1955 (B.A. 1917)
Bertil Ohlin (1899–1979), liberal leader and economist, Nobel laureate, see above
Tage Erlander (1901–1985), Prime Minister of Sweden, 1946–1969 (B.A. 1928)
Gunnar Jarring (1907-2002), ambassador, UN diplomat and scholar of Turkic languages (Ph.D. 1933)
Ingvar Carlsson (1934-), Prime Minister of Sweden 1986-91, 1994-96 (B.A. 1958)
Tarja Cronberg (1943-), Finnish Green Party politician, Member of the European Parliament (Eng. D. 1973)
Lena Ek (1958-), Member of the European Parliament (J.D., LL.D.)
Ruth Bader Ginsburg (1933–2020), Associate Justice of the United States Supreme Court 1933–2020; studied at Lund in the 1960s
Rupiah Banda (1937–2022), President of Zambia, 2008-2011 (B.A. 1964)
H. M. G. S. Palihakkara (1948–), Sri Lankan ambassador and UN diplomat, studied at Lund in the 1980s
Jimmie Åkesson (1979–), politician for the Sweden Democrats, Member of the Swedish Parliament

Mathematics, physics and astronomy
Axel Möller (1830-1896), astronomer (Ph.D. 1853, professor 1863-1895)
Albert Victor Bäcklund (1845-1912), mathematician and physicist (Bäcklund transform) (Ph.D. 1868, professor from 1878)
Johannes Rydberg (1854-1919), physicist (Rydberg formula, Rydberg constant) (Ph.D. 1873, Professor from 1897)
Carl Charlier (1862-1934), astronomer, awarded the James Craig Watson Medal in 1924 and the Bruce Medal in 1933 (Professor from 1897, head of the Lund Observatory)
Adrian Constantin (born 1970), Romanian-Austrian mathematician, winner of Wittgenstein Award
Elis Strömgren (1870-1947), astronomer, Director of the Observatory at Copenhagen University (Ph.D. 1898)
V. Walfrid Ekman (1874-1954), oceanographer (Ekman spiral, Ekman number) (Professor 1910-1939)
Carl Wilhelm Oseen (1879-1944), mathematician and physicist, Director of the Nobel Institute for Theoretical Physics (Ph.D 1903)
Manne Siegbahn (1886-1978), physicist, Nobel laureate, see above
 Anders Lindstedt (1954-1939) mathematician, astronomer and pioneer of actuarial science.
Knut Lundmark (1889-1958), astronomer (Professor, head of Lund Observatory, 1929-1955)
Gunnar Malmquist (1893-1982), astronomer (Ph.D. 1921)
Oskar Klein (1894-1977), physicist (Docent 1926-30)
Marcel Riesz (1886-1969), mathematician (Riesz function, Riesz theorems, Riesz mean, Riesz potential) (Professor from 1926)
Lars Gårding (1919-2014), mathematician (Gårding's inequality) (Professor)
Gunnar Källén (1926-1968) theoretical physicist (Professor) 
Lars Hörmander (1931-2012), mathematician, awarded the Fields medal in 1962 (Ph.D. 1955, Professor from 1968)
Duncan Steel (1955-), authority on space science

Medicine and life sciences
Johan Jacob Döbelius (1674-1743), professor of medicine, headmaster, discovered Ramlösa hälsobrunn
Carl Linnaeus (1707-1778), father of modern taxonomy. (studied his first year in Lund, transferred to Uppsala)
Johan Gottschalk Wallerius (1709-1785), chemist and mineralogist, member of the Royal Swedish Academy of Sciences
Anders Jahan Retzius (1742-1821), naturalist
Carl Adolph Agardh (1785-1859), naturalist (botanist); clergyman; bishop of Karlstad
Anders Retzius (1796-1860), anatomist
Carl Fredrik Fallén (1764-1830), botanist and entomologist
Axel Gustaf Gyllenkrok (1783-1865), zoologist
Johan Wilhelm Zetterstedt (1785-1874), entomologist
Elias Magnus Fries (1794-1878), mycologist (student from 1811, Professor from 1824, from 1834 professor at Uppsala)
Anders Gustaf Dahlbom (1806-1859), entomologist
Jacob Georg Agardh (1813-1901), botanist
Gustaf Retzius (1842-1919), anatomist
Hjördis Lind-Campbell (1891-1984), physician, known for her work in sex education and founding of an adoption program for unmarried women.
Dora Jacobsohn (1903-1983), physiologist and endocrinologist
Rune Elmqvist (1906-1996), developed first implantable pacemaker (M.D.)
Sune Bergström (1916-2004), biochemist, Nobel laureate, see above
Arvid Carlsson (1923-2018), physician, Nobel laureate, see above
Hildegard Björck (1847-1920), first woman in Sweden to earn an academic degree
Björn Folkow (1921-2012), professor in physiology at the University of Gothenburg between 1961 and 1987 and a member of the Royal Swedish Academy of Sciences.
Olle Hagnell (1924-2011), psychiatrist and epidemiologist
Arne Strid (1943-), botanist

Engineering
Per Georg Scheutz (1785-1873), computing pioneer, Scheutzian calculation engine (J.D. 1805)
Martin Wiberg (1826-1905), inventor, logarithmic table generating machines (Ph.D. 1850)
Carl Hellmuth Hertz (1920-1990) pioneered medical ultrasonography (with Inge Edler) (Professor) 
Karl Johan Åström (1934-), control theorist, IEEE Fellow, IEEE Medal of Honor winner (Professor 1965-2002)
Michael Treschow (1943-), Businessman, chairman of Ericsson (M.Eng.)
Boris Smeds (1944-), radio engineer at ESA (M. Eng., Licentiate 1972, Honorary Doctor, 2006)
Lennart Ljung (1946-), control theorist, IEEE Fellow (B.A. 1967, M.Sc. 1970, Ph.D. 1974)
Jola Sigmond (1943-), architect, Swedish Association of Architects

Humanities and social sciences
Samuel Pufendorf (1632-1694), German jurist, political scientist and historian (Professor 1670-1677)
Carl August Hagberg (1810-1864), linguist and translator
Knut Wicksell (1851-1926), economist (Professor 1900-1916)
Torgny Segerstedt (1876-1945), scholar of comparative religion, anti-Nazi journalist (B.A. 1901, Docent 1903)
Torsten Hägerstrand (1916-2004), cultural geographer (Ph.D. 1953, Professor)
Axel Leijonhufvud (1933-2022), economist (B.A.)
Judith Wallerstein (1921-2012), psychologist and researcher at University of California at Berkeley (Ph.D. 1978)
Margot Bengtsson (1943–), psychologist
Etzel Cardeña (1957-), Thorsen Professor of Psychology; Director of the Center for Research on Consciousness and Anomalous Psychology
Katsuya Kodama (1959-), Japanese sociologist and peace researcher

Literature
Bengt Lidner (1757-1793), poet. (Student 1774-1776)
Thomas Thorild (1759-1808), poet, critic and philosopher
Esaias Tegnér (1782-1846), poet, bishop of Växjö (B.A. 1802, Professor 1812-1824)
Frans G. Bengtsson (1894-1954), author, The Long Ships (Licentiate 1930)
Eva Alexanderson (1911-1994), novelist, translator (B.A. 1935)
Susanna Roxman (1946-2015), writer, poet and critic (studied at King's College, London University, then at Lund University; later PhD in    Gothenburg)
Dilruba Z. Ara (1957–), writer

Music, theatre, and entertainment
Otto Lindblad (1809-1864), composer (Student 1829-1836)
Sten Broman :sv:Sten Broman (1902-1983), musician, music critic, TV host; founder of Uarda-akademien.
Hans Alfredson (1931-2017), writer, entertainer and film director, former head of Skansen (B.A. 1956)
 Royal Republic Rock band (All members attended)

Honorary doctorates
John Ericsson (1803-1889), inventor, father of the USS Monitor (1868)
Carver Mead (1934-), computer scientist (1987)
Thomas Mann (1875–1955), novelist (1949)
Gustavus Simmons (1930-), cryptographer (1991)
Kofi Annan (1938-2018), UN Secretary General (1999)
Santiago Calatrava (1951-), architect (1999)

References 

Lund University
Lund